Bifrenaria mellicolor is a species of orchid.

mellicolor